Jesse Waleson (born 25 May 2001) is a Dutch basketball player for Landstede Hammers on loan from Filou Oostende of the BNXT League.

Early career
At age 16, Waleson moved from the Netherlands to Spain to play for the UCEM Mataro U18 team. After a year, he returned to play for the Orange Lions Academy. Waleson later signed with BC Oostende to play for their U21 team.

Professional career
On 13 December 2020, Waleson made his debut for Filou Oostende against Mons-Hainaut, contributing 6 points in a 72–75 loss. On 11 April 2021, he had a career-high 11 points against Phoenix Brussels. Waleson averaged 3.4 points and 2.5 rebounds per game. On February 14, 2022, he was sent on loan to Kangoeroes Mechelen of the BNXT League.

In February 2023, Waleson was sent on loan to Landstede Hammers for the remainder of the season.

National team career
Waleson has played for the  U18 team.

References

2001 births
Living people
Basketball players from Amsterdam
BC Oostende players
Centers (basketball)
Dutch men's basketball players
Kangoeroes Basket Mechelen players
Sportspeople from Amsterdam
Landstede Hammers players
Dutch expatriate basketball people in Belgium